Columbus FC is a Canadian soccer club based in Vancouver, British Columbia currently playing in the Premier division of the Vancouver Metro Soccer League. In 2013, the club was recognized as a Canada Soccer Hall of Fame Organization of Distinction.

History

Father Della Torre was instrumental in  starting the team in 1953 as Sacred Heart soccer team, with the goal of providing a team for the many Italian immigrants who settled in the east side of Vancouver.

By 1957, the team name changed to Columbus and was under the guidance of Peter Mainardi. As president, Mainairdi gave the club stability and strong leadership and paved the way for Columbus' future successes. After joining the Pacific Coast League in 1959–60, they became one of the league's most popular and successful teams of the 1960s. After winning their first national title in 1964, they won back-to-back Pacific Coast League playoff titles in 1965 and 1966 and then finally their first Pacific Coast League championship in 1968–69. In that 1968–69 season, they won the league, the playoffs, BC Soccer's Province Cup, and Canada Soccer's Challenge Trophy.

Their domination on the field captured the imagination of the Italian soccer community in particular. The team played at Callister Park in Vancouver at that time.

In all, Columbus FC played 12 seasons in the Pacific Coast League from 1959–60 to 1970–71, winning three championships (1968–69, 1969–70, 1970–71) and four playoff titles (1965, 1966, 1969, 1970). In 1972, they joined the newly formed British Columbia Premier League and won both the league and playoff title.

In 1973, for having played in an unsanctioned tournament, the club and its owner Peter Mainardi were suspended.  Therefore, for a few years the same players played under the Vancouver Italia name until coming back with the Columbus name in 1975.

Following the death of Mainairdi, the club came under the guidance of Paul Anthony who had joined the team as a player in 1954.

Anthony continued on as secretary and team manager and played a key role in the evolution of the club until his death in 1982.  From 1982 to 1987, the administration of the club was under the leadership of Eugenio Vazzoler, Peter Greco and General manager Charlie Cuzzetto.

In 1985, Columbus entered the newly formed semi-professional Pacific Rim Soccer League with Joe Tinucci as president and Mike Bernardis as coach. Columbus as a semi-professional club, quickly became cup champions as well as national finalists with Toronto Blizzard.

After an absence of 10 years Columbus re-emerged in 2003 under the direction of Rob Mascitti, Carmen D'Onofrio and Joe Papa.  Although the passing of years has seen the influx of non -Italian players, the major part of the team still hold fast to its Italian roots, a tribute to past Coaches Gianni Azzi, Jack Hobbs 1964 (Canadian Champions) Joe Csabai 1969 (Canadian Champions), Tony Canta 1977, 1978 (Canadian Champions).

Columbus has been at the forefront of Canadian soccer and has planted deep soccer roots in Canada over the past 70 years. The team has provided more players than any other amateur club in Canada to Canada's Professional, Provincial, Olympic and National Team rosters as well as supplying Universities and Colleges. Columbus also holds the distinction of having the most players in the Canadian Soccer Hall of Fame with eleven players. After the Westminster Royals, Columbus is the most successful amateur club in Canada having appeared in six National Finals and winning four. Columbus also holds the record for the largest margin of victory in a Canadian championship final game a 10–0 score against Montreal Ukraine in 1969.

The Columbus family of teams include the men's open premier team, Division 2 team, women's Division 2 team, over 35s, over 45s (Premier and Division 1), over 50s,over 55s and over 60s. As of 2015, Columbus family of teams are now associated with the Italian Canadian Sports Federation, which also include boys and girls teams from five-year-olds to adult.  

Off the field the Columbus Alumni also play a major role in Canadian soccer as evidenced by the following:

 Victor Montagliani:
President of CONCACAF
Vice-president FIFA
 President of Canadian Soccer Association
  Past vice-president Canadian Soccer Association
  Past president British Columbia Soccer Association
 Charlie Cuzzetto
 Member of FIFA Player Tribunal
 Member of FIFA Disciplinary Committee
 Director of Canadian Soccer Association
 Member of CONCACAF Appeals Committee 
 Past president British Columbia Soccer Association
 Selected to the BC Soccer Roll of Honour
 Joe Cuzzetto
 Former technical director – Italian Canadian SportsFederation (ICSF)
 Former director of British Columbia Soccer Association
 Selected to the BC Soccer Roll of Honour
 Author of the book  The Columbus Football Club - Our Story
 Frank Ciaccia
Residency recruitment officer – Vancouver Whitecaps
 Former technical director—Mountain FC
 Selected to the BC Soccer Roll of Honour
 Danny Lenarduzzi
 Director of youth soccer development — Vancouver Whitecaps
Sam Lenarduzzi
Manager of regional community programs – Vancouver Whitecaps
Frank Iuele
Technical director – Italian Canadian Sports Federation (ICSF)
Technical director - Burnaby Metro Program
 Michael Findlay
 Former BC Soccer head of soccer development
 Former Canada Soccer Men's National Team Head Coach
 Past Coach Grenada National Team

In addition to winning numerous league championships, Kennedy Cups, Imperial Cups and Provincial Cups, Columbus has won the Challenge Trophy four times: 1964, 1969, 1977 and 1978 and were finalists in 1968 and 2007.

In addition, Columbus Masters Over 35s also won a National Championship in 2003 and Western Championship in 2009 and 2013. The Over 40s have won two league and one cup  championships. Since 2003, Columbus plays in the VMSL and have won a Provincial Cup, two Imperial Cups, two Western Canadian Championships and one Provincial Cup Finalist and one Canadian National Trophy Cup Finalist.

Honours

National trophy winners by player for Columbus FC only

Notable former players
Thirteen former Columbus FC players have been inducted into the Canada Soccer Hall of Fame as honoured players.
 Eddie Bak
 Chris Bennett
 Errol Crossan
 Victor Kodelja
 Bob Lenarduzzi
 Sam Lenarduzzi
 Normie McLeod
 Wes McLeod
 Buzz Parsons
 Ken Pears (on loan)
 Bobby Smith
 Gogie Stewart
 Gino Vazzoler
 Bruce Wilson

 Charlie Cuzzetto—-Futsal Canada Hall of Fame

There are other notable Columbus FC alumni who played, coached or been executives at the national and/or professional level.

 Carlo Alberti 
 Dino Alberti
 Ivano Belfiore
 Luca Bellisomo
 Gordon Chin
 Elio Ciaccia
 Frank Ciaccia
 Tino Cucca
 Charlie Cuzzetto
 Joe Cuzzetto
 Michael D'Agostino
 Carmen D'Onofrio
 Alex Elliott
 Michael Findlay
 Peter Greco
 Justin Isidro
 Tiarnan King
 Danny Lenarduzzi
David McGill 
 Victor Montagliani
 Steve Nesin
 Joe Scigliano
 Leigh Sembaluk
 Guido Titotto
 Sergio Zanatta
 Gianluca Zavarise

References

Soccer clubs in Vancouver